Lycée Français de Séville is a French international school in Seville, Spain. A part of the Mission Laïque Française (MLF), it serves ages 3–18.

See also
 Liceo Español Luis Buñuel, a Spanish international school near Paris, France

Notes

External links
  Lycée Français de Séville
  Liceo Francés de Sevilla - Red de Colegios y Liceos Franceses España-Portugal (EFEP)
  AMPA Liceo Francés de Sevilla

French international schools in Spain
Schools in Seville
International schools in Andalusia